Øveraas is a surname. Notable people with the surname include:

Eli Sollied Øveraas (born 1949), Norwegian politician
Harald Øveraas (1927–2014), Norwegian trade unionist
Jørgen Olsen Øveraas (born 1989), Norwegian footballer 

Norwegian-language surnames